Arab al-Rashayida is a Palestinian village located twelve kilometers east of Jerusalem. The village is in the Bethlehem Governorate, central West Bank. According to the Palestinian Central Bureau of Statistics, the city had a population of 1,453 in 2007.

History 
In the wake of the 1948 Arab–Israeli War, and after the 1949 Armistice Agreements, Al-Rashayida came under Jordanian rule.

Since the Six-Day War in 1967, the village has been under Israeli occupation. 

After the 1995 accords, 5.7% of al-Rashayida's land was classified as Area A, 1.1% classified as Area B, 10.2% classified as Area C, while the remaining 83% is classified as "nature reserve".

Footnotes

External links 
Welcome To Arab al-Rashaydih
'Arab ar Rashayida Village (fact sheet), Applied Research Institute–Jerusalem, ARIJ
 'Arab ar Rashaiyda Village profile, ARIJ
'Arab ar Rashayida  aerial photo, ARIJ

Villages in the West Bank
Bethlehem Governorate
Municipalities of the State of Palestine